Activated blood coagulation factor XI may refer to:
 Coagulation factor IXa, an enzyme
 Coagulation factor XIa, an enzyme